Triangle: Going to America is a 2014 Ethiopian action thriller film written and directed by Theodros Teshome. It was nominated in three different categories at the 2015 Africa Movie Academy Awards; Best Film in an African Language, Best Director and Best Film.

It won the "Festival Founders' Award- Narrative" at the 2015 Pan African Film Festival and also won "Audience Award" at the Rwanda Film Festival also in 2015.

Synopsis 
A film that spanned three continents and deals with the issue of illegal immigration to America. Kaleab and Jemal are willing to whatever it takes to reach America for a better life. On the arduous journey, they meet the beautiful Winta (Mahder Assefa), a fellow migrant from neighboring Eritrea. Kaleab and Winta fall in love as they make their way from East Africa through Libya, Italy, Mexico and finally to America.

Cast 

 Kristos Andrews as Switch
 Mahder Assefa as Winta
 Abebe Balcha as Dr. Abdurahim
 Isabella Rain Barbieri as Little Margarita
 Solomon Bogale as Kaleab
 Steve Crest as Police Officer Crest
 Jane Drewett as Nurse (Jane Monroe)
 Joel Layogan as Dr. Sanchez
 Abraham Luna as Mexican Blood Guy #2
 Jessica Mathews (I) as Mrs. Abdurahim

References

External links 
 

2014 films
2014 action films
2014 thriller films
Ethiopian drama films